Eugenio Elorduy Walther (born November 21, 1940 in Calexico, California) is a Mexican politician. He was governor of his adoptive state of Baja California from November 1, 2001 thru October 31, 2007. His wife Elena Blackaller served as first lady.

Biography
He graduated with honors from the Instituto Tecnologico y de Estudios Superiores de Monterrey (ITESM) in Business Administration in 1965. He became a member of the Partido Acción Nacional three years later and was elected as a council member in 1968, state congressman in 1974. He was the Secretary of Finance under Ernesto Ruffo's administration (1989–1995). He was elected as president of the municipality of Mexicali for the 1995-1998 term for the National Action Party (PAN). He was elected on July 8, 2001 as governor of his state representing the PAN (in alliance with the Green Party of Mexico).

Governorship of Baja California
In 2007 Elorduy was accused by members of his own party that he supported the primary candidacy of José Guadalupe Osuna, to this he declared that the PAN will keep the governorship in the next six years.

Organized crime
During the government of Ernesto Ruffo (1989–1995) Elorduy paid 150,000 pesos (roughly 50,000 US dollars) of state funds to bail out Sergio Ortiz Lara when he was accused in 1994 of collaborating with drug dealers.

In a video released by the Zeta weekly, a former  commander of the state police accused Antonio Martínez Luna, Baja California's Attorney General, and other members of public security of being involved in activities regarding drug trafficking, homicide, kidnapping, disappearing and hiding of dead bodies and accepting bribes.

In 2001, Antonio Carmona, Elorduy's chief of police during his mayorship of Mexicali was condemned to 36 years of jail for contributing with drug-dealing and organized crime.

See also
List of Mexican state governors
Governor of Baja California
Baja California
 List of presidents of Mexicali Municipality

References

External links
 Profile at the Baja California government website.
 Profile at the Mexican Government official website.

1940 births
Living people
Mexican people of German descent
Governors of Baja California
History of Baja California
People from Calexico, California
People from Mexicali
Monterrey Institute of Technology and Higher Education alumni
National Action Party (Mexico) politicians
Municipal presidents of Mexicali
Politicians from Baja California
20th-century Mexican politicians
21st-century Mexican politicians